This is a list of notable individuals and organizations who have voiced their endorsement of Andrew Yang's campaign for the Democratic Party's nomination for the 2020 U.S. presidential election.

Federal officials

U.S. Representatives

Former

Mike Honda, former U.S. Representative from CA-15 (2001–2013) and CA-17 (2013–2017)

State officials

State legislators

Current

John Bordenet, member of New Hampshire House of Representatives Cheshire District 05
Evan Low, member of California's 28th State Assembly district and former mayor of Campbell, California (previously endorsed Kamala Harris)

Local and municipal officials

Mayors

Current
Barbara Hopkins, Mayor of Sellers, South Carolina

Former
Steve Marchand, former Mayor of Portsmouth, New Hampshire and two-time Democratic gubernatorial candidate for New Hampshire

Local officials
Teresa Keng, member of the Fremont, California City Council
Leslie Want, member of the Manchester, New Hampshire School Board

Notable individuals

Activists
Cameron Kasky, gun control activist and co-founder of March for Our Lives

Businesspeople
Sam Altman, entrepreneur and co-chairman of OpenAI
Tony Hsieh, businessman and CEO of Zappos
James Monsees, businessman and co-founder of Juul
Elon Musk, entrepreneur, engineer and CEO of Tesla, Inc. and SpaceX 
Alexis Ohanian, entrepreneur, investor, and co-founder of Reddit
Jack Dorsey, entrepreneur, computer programmer and CEO of Twitter and Square

Journalists and commentators
Bari Weiss, editor and opinion writer for The New York Times

Medical Doctors
Eugene Gu, former resident physician, social media personality, plaintiff in lawsuit against Donald Trump

Scholars and academics
Peter Boghossian, assistant professor of philosophy at Portland State University
Xudong Huang, medical researcher, Co-Director of the Neurochemistry Lab of Psychiatry Department at the Massachusetts General Hospital and associate professor of psychiatry at Harvard Medical School
Christina Hoff Sommers, author, philosopher, and resident scholar at the American Enterprise Institute
Bret Weinstein,  biologist and evolutionary theorist

Celebrities

Actors
Nicolas Cage, actor
Noah Centineo, actor
Dane DeHaan, actor
Donald Glover, actor, comedian, and musician
Teri Hatcher, actress, writer, presenter, and singer
Ken Jeong, actor, comedian, former physician, and voice artist
Penn Jillette, magician and actor
John Leguizamo, actor (previously endorsed Julián Castro)
Simu Liu, actor
Steven Yeun, actor

Athletes

Antonio Bryant, former NFL player
Chris Jericho, Canadian-American professional wrestler
Jermaine Johnson, former NBA D-League player
Daniel Negreanu, professional poker player
Mark Schultz, Olympic wrestler
Marcellus Wiley, former NFL player
Dominique Wilkins, former NBA player

Comedians

Hannibal Buress, comedian, actor, writer, and producer
Dave Chappelle, comedian
Ronny Chieng, comedian, actor, and correspondent for The Daily Show
Thomas Chong, Canadian-American actor and comedian
Norm Macdonald, comedian
Donnell Rawlings, comedian and actor
Doug Stanhope, comedian
Michelle Wolf, comedian
Joe Wong, comedian

Filmmakers
James Gunn, filmmaker and musician
Kirsten Lepore, animator

Internet personalities

Adam22, Internet personality
Lloyd Ahlquist, Internet personality
Ken Bone, Internet personality and political activist
Ryan Higa, Internet personality
Ethan Klein, Internet personality and YouTuber 
Casey Neistat, Internet personality and filmmaker

Musicians
Anita Baker, singer-songwriter
Rich Brian, musician
Rivers Cuomo, musician
MC Jin, rapper, actor, and songwriter
The Fat Boys, American hip hop trio
Eric B. & Rakim, American hip hop duo
Zhu, electronic musician

Newspapers and other media

Newspapers
The Sun, Lowell, Massachusetts
Sentinel & Enterprise, Fitchburg, Massachusetts

See also
 Endorsements in the 2020 Democratic Party presidential primaries
 News media endorsements in the 2020 United States presidential primaries

References

External links
 
Andrew Yang's official website 
Official website of the Democratic Party

Andrew Yang
Yang, Andrew
Yang, Andrew